Francisco Sotomayor, O.F.M. (died February 5, 1630) was a Roman Catholic prelate who served as the Archbishop of La Plata o Charcas (1628–1630), the Bishop of Quito (1623–1628), and the Bishop of Cartagena in Colombia (1623).

Biography
Francisco Sotomayor was born in Santo Tomé, Spain ordained a priest in the Order of Friars Minor. On May 22, 1623, he was appointed by the King of Spain as Bishop of Cartagena in Colombia. On May 22, 1623, he was appointed by the King of Spain and confirmed by Pope Urban VIII as Bishop of Quito. On August 18, 1624, he was consecrated bishop by Gonzalo del Campo, Archbishop of Lima. On June 5, 1628, he was appointed by the King of Spain and confirmed by Pope Urban VIII as Bishop of La Plata o Charcas. He served as Bishop of La Plata o Charcas until his death on February 5, 1630.

References

External links and additional sources
 (for Chronology of Bishops) 
 (for Chronology of Bishops) 
 (for Chronology of Bishops) 
 (for Chronology of Bishops) 
 (for Chronology of Bishops) 
 (for Chronology of Bishops) 

1630 deaths
Bishops appointed by Pope Urban VIII
Roman Catholic bishops of Cartagena in Colombia
Franciscan bishops
17th-century Roman Catholic bishops in Ecuador
17th-century Roman Catholic bishops in New Granada
17th-century Roman Catholic bishops in Bolivia
Roman Catholic bishops of Quito
Roman Catholic archbishops of Sucre